Michael True (1933 - 2019) was an English literature professor and poet based in Worcester, Massachusetts.

Works 
 Daniel Berrigan: Poetry, Drama, Prose (1988, editor)
 An Energy Field More Intense Than War: The Nonviolent Tradition in American Literature (1995)

References

Further reading 

 
 
 

1933 births
2019 deaths
English literature academics
People from Worcester, Massachusetts
Assumption College faculty